Microsarotis is a genus of moths belonging to the subfamily Olethreutinae of the family Tortricidae.

Species
Microsarotis arushae Razowski, 2015
Microsarotis bicincta (Diakonoff, 1976)
Microsarotis lucida (Meyrick, 1916)
Microsarotis lygistis (Diakonoff, 1977)
Microsarotis palamedes (Meyrick, 1916)
Microsarotis pauliani Diakonoff, 1988
Microsarotis samaruana Razowski, 2013
Microsarotis sanderyi Komai & Horak, in Horak, 2006

See also
List of Tortricidae genera

References

External links
tortricidae.com

Grapholitini
Tortricidae genera
Taxa named by Alexey Diakonoff